Persoonia tenuifolia, commonly known as fine-leaf geebung is a plant in the family Proteaceae and is endemic to eastern Australia.

Description
Flowering mainly occurs from November to February.

Taxonomy
Persoonia tenuifolia was first formally described in 1830 by Robert Brown in the Supplementum to his Prodromus Florae Novae Hollandiae et Insulae Van Diemen from specimens collected in 1827 near Moreton Bay by Charles Fraser.

Distribution and habitat
It is found in near-coastal areas between Bundaberg in Queensland and Grafton in New South Wales and well as on the Great Dividing Range and nearby tablelands from Dalveen in Queensland to the Torrington and Yetman districts in New South Wales.

References

tenuifolia
Flora of Queensland
Flora of New South Wales
Plants described in 1830
Taxa named by Robert Brown (botanist, born 1773)